The 2014–15 Macedonian First League was the 23rd season of the Macedonian First Football League, the highest football league of Macedonia. It began on 2 August 2014 and ended on 27 May 2015.

That season was featured 10 teams instead of 12 because the Football Federation of Macedonia voted to decrease the size of the league in May 2013.

Promotion and relegation

Participating teams

Personnel and kits

Note: Flags indicate national team as has been defined under FIFA eligibility rules. Players may hold more than one non-FIFA nationality.

Regular season
The first 27 Rounds comprise the first phase of the season, also called the Regular season. In the first phase, every team plays against every other team twice on a home-away basis till all the teams have played two matches against each other. The table standings at the end of the Regular season determine the group in which each team is going to play in the Play-offs.

League table

Results

Matches 1–18

Matches 19–27

Second phase
The second phase are the so-called Play-off Rounds which is divided in two groups: Championship and Relegation. The top 6 ranked teams on the table after the Regular Season qualify for the Championship group, while the bottom 4 advance to the Relegation group.

Championship round
In the Championship group, each team plays against every other one only once, making 5 games in total. Records from the first phase are carried over. Teams play each other once with each team playing five games in this round.

Table

Results

Relegation round
In the Relegation group, each team plays twice against every opponent on a home-away basis. Records from the first phase are carried over. Teams play each other twice with each team playing six games in this round.

Table

Results

Relegation playoff

First leg

Second leg

Horizont Turnovo won 3–1 on aggregate

Season statistics

Top scorers

See also
2014–15 Macedonian Football Cup
2014–15 Macedonian Second Football League
2014–15 Macedonian Third Football League

References

External links
Football Federation of Macedonia 
MacedonianFootball.com 

Macedonia
1
2014-15